Guru Mampuzha Madhava Panicker (1900–1973) was a traditional Kathakali dancer and instructor. He was the former principal of the Kerala Kalamandalam University of Art and Culture in Cheruthuruthi in Kerala State in India. Panicker was of the Kalluvazhi (midland) school of Kathakali. He received the Sangeet Natak Akademi Award in 1972.

He was born in Kottappadi, near Guruvayur, in Thrissur district in 1900. Panicker was one of the first pupils of Pattikkantodi Ramunni Menon. He became an expert in handling heroes like Arjuna, Bhima, and Daksha, and villains like Ravana, Duryodhana, and Herod. His main contribution lay in presenting Biblical stories, compressing full-length productions, and even introducing Hindi songs. He was chief artiste in several palace troupes at Punnathur, Katathanad, and Nilampur, and art centres in Kerala and beyond. He taught at Kerala Kalamandalam and the International Centre for Kathakali, New Delhi, where he also served as principal. Mampuzha Madhava Panicker died in 1973.

References

Indian male dancers
1973 deaths
1900 births
Kathakali exponents
Recipients of the Sangeet Natak Akademi Award
Dancers from Kerala
Malayali people
People from Thrissur district
20th-century Indian dancers